The 1934 Tour de Suisse was the 2nd edition of the Tour de Suisse stage race. It took place from 25 August to 1 September 1934. It started and finished in Zürich. The race was composed of seven stages. The event covered 1,475 km (916 mi) all in Switzerland. The race was won by Ludwig Geyer.

General classification

References

1934
Tour de Suisse